Christian Nadé (born 18 September 1984) is a French professional footballer who plays as a forward for WoSFL Premier Division club Petershill.

Nadé has played for clubs such as Troyes AC, Le Havre, Sheffield United, Heart of Midlothian and Dundee, and has also represented the France national under-21 football team.

Early life
Nadé was born and grew up in Montmorency, a northern suburb of Paris, France until his parents divorced when he was 13. He moved to England in 2006 at the age of 21.

International career
Nadé represented France at Under-21 level, alongside Arsenal forward Jeremie Aliadiere, Blackburn Captain Gael Givet, Liverpool strike duo Florent Sinama Pongolle and Anthony Le Tallec, future Manchester United defender Patrice Evra and Barcelona defender Jeremy Mathieu.

Club career

Troyes
He came through the ranks at ES Troyes AC, and made his debut for the reserves on 19 January 2000 against RC Strasbourg reserves in the Championnat de France Amateur (CFA). While with Troyes, he spent a six-month loan spell at Le Havre.

Sheffield United
He signed a three-year contract for Sheffield United on 27 June 2006 and scored on his debut for the club in a friendly against Rotherham United on 28 July after coming on as substitute for Rob Hulse in the 70th minute. He scored his first competitive goal for the Blades in a League Cup 2nd round tie against Bury at Bramall Lane on 19 September 2006. His first Premiership goal came on 30 December 2006 against Arsenal in a famous 1–0 win. It was the last goal of 2006 in English football. On 16 July 2007 Hull City confirmed that they had agreed a fee with Sheffield United for Nadé, believed to be in the region of £550,000, and were to hold talks with the striker. Due to concerns over his long-term fitness Nadé was offered an incentive-based contract, which he refused and the move subsequently broke down.

Hearts
Nadé signed for SPL outfit Hearts in a three-year deal on 31 August 2007. He made his debut on 3 September 2007 in a 2–0 victory over Motherwell at Fir Park and his first league goal came in a 4–2 home win over Falkirk on 6 October 2007. Neil Warnock, Nadé's manager at former club Sheffield United, declared his interest in signing the striker for Crystal Palace in June 2008. His first season with the club was his most prolific as he scored five goals in total. Prior to the 2008–09 season Csaba László was appointed Hearts manager and due to injuries and fitness concerns during pre-season Nadé struggled to break into the starting line up with Jamie Mole being preferred as the lone-striker in László's newly implemented formation. However, after several appearances as a substitute he eventually established himself as first-choice striker and Mole was loaned out to Dunfermline Athletic in January for the remainder of the season. During October 2009, Nadé revealed that his club form had been affected by personal problems off the field. Following a 2–0 defeat to Celtic in February 2010 he was involved in a dressing room bust-up with teammate Ian Black which resulted in the Frenchman being frozen out of the squad for approximately a month. Nadé was released by Hearts at the end of the 2009–10 season. This decision was disputed by Nadé, who claimed he had agreed a new contract with the club.

Cyprus and Thailand
On 29 July 2010 Nadé signed a 3-year contract with the Cypriot side Alki Larnaca.

After a trial with TOT S.C. and Osotspa Saraburi during spring 2011, Nadé signed a contract with Thai Premier League side Samut Songkhram. He was officially unveiled in May 2011. After two years at the club Nadé joined PTT Rayong.

Nadé agreed to sign for Scottish club East Fife in the summer of 2013, but the move collapsed because the club was unable to obtain international clearance for the move. Upon the move breaking down, East Fife's chairman Lee Murray said that he didn't care that the striker's move to East Fife had collapsed and that he "never thought he was that great."

Dundee
He then signed for another Scottish club, Dundee, in January 2014. Nadé made his debut for Dundee, on 25 January 2014, in a 2–0 loss against Falkirk. After making four appearances, Nadé scored his first goal for the club, as they beat Greenock Morton 2–0 on 1 March 2014. His performances as the Dee won the Championship to return to the top tier made him hugely popular with the Dundee supporters. He scored the first goal as Dundee beat Dumbarton 2–1 at Dens Park in the last game of the season to clinch the title. Despite making an impression at Dundee, Nadé was released upon his expiry of his contract. Although released by the club, Nadé remains optimistic of finding a new club. Nadé also stated he lost weight, quoting: "I'm in better condition than I’ve ever been in my career."''

Raith Rovers
On 17 June 2014 Nadé agreed to sign for Raith Rovers.  He scored the winning goal in Raith's 2–1 win over Rangers in the fifth round Scottish Cup tie on 9 February 2015. It was the club's first away win against Rangers since 1959.

Hamilton Academical
On 13 July 2015, Nadé joined Hamilton alongside Antons Kurakins, Gramoz Kurtaj and Nico Sumsky. He was released by the club in January 2016.

Dumbarton
He joined Dumbarton on 31 January 2016. His first goal for the club came at home in a 3–2 victory over Hibernian which he celebrated in front of the visiting fans He scored his first career hat-trick in his third league game for the club, a 3–1 win over Alloa on 8 March 2016. In June 2016 Sons' manager Stevie Aitken admitted a deal to keep Nadé at the club was "dead".

Stranraer
After leaving Dumbarton, Nadé signed for Scottish League One side Stranraer in July 2016.

On 10 November 2016, Nadé was released by Stranraer. After leaving the blues he played as a trialist for Scottish League Two side Annan Athletic

Dumbarton return
He rejoined Dumbarton on 31 December 2016, and extended his deal until the summer of 2018 in May 2017. He didn't appear again for the club after being charged with a number of criminal offences, which he was later cleared of, and left the club upon expiry of his contract at the end of the season.

Troon
Nadé joined Junior side Troon in July 2018 after a spell training on his own amidst rumours and controversy surrounding his private life. The Troon management team of Jimmy Kirkwood & Nadé's former Stranraer Coach Matt Maley took a chance on the forward & their belief in him was rewarded with 14 goals in 29 appearances at Troon, which is the most prolific spell of his career to date.

Always keen to return to senior football, Nadé signed for Annan Athletic on the last day of the January transfer window.

Annan Athletic 
Nadé returned to senior football in February 2019, joining Scottish League Two side Annan Athletic.

Troon return
Nadé re-signed for his former club Troon to play alongside his former Hearts team-mates Ryan Stevenson and Jordan Morton for their debut season in the West of Scotland Football League on 7 July 2020.

Annbank United 
In November 2020, Nadé signed for West of Scotland Football League side Annbank United.

Muirkirk Juniors 
In July 2021, Nadé signed for West of Scotland League side Muirkirk Juniors.

Petershill
In November 2022, West of Scotland Football League Premier Division side Petershill announced that they had signed Nadé. On 3 December, Nadé scored his first goal for Petershill in their first league victory of the season against Kirkintilloch Rob Roy. His following appearance against Irvine Meadow XI was also notable as Nadé would be sent off just three minutes in, having been shown 2 yellow cards for dissent in the space of 20 seconds.

Career statistics
As of 19 May 2020 (UTC)

Personal life
In October 2018 Nadé revealed that he had tried to commit suicide in 2014 following struggles with depression. In June 2020, he appeared in a special podcast panel discussing his experiences of racism in football with A View from the Terrace host Craig Fowler.

Honours 
Dundee

 Scottish Championship: 2013–14

References

External links

1984 births
Living people
People from Montmorency, Val-d'Oise
Footballers from Val-d'Oise
French sportspeople of Ivorian descent
Association football forwards
French footballers
France under-21 international footballers
French expatriate footballers
Expatriate footballers in England
Expatriate footballers in Scotland
Expatriate footballers in Cyprus
Expatriate footballers in Thailand
French expatriate sportspeople in England
French expatriate sportspeople in Scotland
French expatriate sportspeople in Cyprus
French expatriate sportspeople in Thailand
ES Troyes AC players
Le Havre AC players
Sheffield United F.C. players
West of Scotland Football League players
Heart of Midlothian F.C. players
Alki Larnaca FC players
Dundee F.C. players
Raith Rovers F.C. players
Hamilton Academical F.C. players
Dumbarton F.C. players
Stranraer F.C. players
Troon F.C. players
Ligue 1 players
Ligue 2 players
Premier League players
Scottish Premier League players
Scottish Professional Football League players
Cypriot First Division players
Annan Athletic F.C. players
Scottish Junior Football Association players
Annbank United F.C. players
Muirkirk Juniors F.C. players
Petershill F.C. players